Jean-Claude Merkes (born 27 December 1940) is a French field hockey player. He competed in the men's tournament at the 1968 Summer Olympics.

References

External links
 

1940 births
Living people
French male field hockey players
Olympic field hockey players of France
Field hockey players at the 1968 Summer Olympics
Sportspeople from Bordeaux